The 2019–20 Belarusian Premier League season was the 28th season of the top tier basketball league in Belarus. The season started on 21 September 2019, the season was suspended after 14 March 2020 because of the COVID-19 pandemic. A concluding Final Four tournament was organised in September 2020. Tsmoki-Minsk defended its title.

Competition format
Ten teams joined the regular season, that consisted in a four-legged round-robin competition, later dividing all the teams into two groups. The six teams of the Group A and the two best of the Group B joined the playoffs.

Teams

Regular season

Standings

Results

Second stage Group A

Standings

Results

Second stage Group B

Standings

Results Group B

Final Four
To conclude the season, a final four round-robin tournament was held in September 2020. Tsmoki-Minsk, Rubon, Borisfen and BK Grodno-93 played one game against each other. Tsmoki-Minsk defended its title, finishing with an unbeaten 3–0 record.

Belarusian clubs in European competitions
Borisfen made its debut in European competitions. However, it was eliminated in the qualifying round of the FIBA Europe Cup.

References

External links 
Belarusian Basketball Federation

Belarusian Premier League (basketball) seasons
Belarus
Premier League